A deposit slip is a form supplied by a bank for a depositor to fill out, designed to document in categories the items included in the deposit transaction. The categories include type of item, and if it is a cheque, where it is from such as a local bank or a state if the bank is not local. The teller keeps the deposit slip along with the deposit (cash and cheques), and provides the depositor with a receipt. They are filled in a store and not a bank, so it is very convenient in paying. They also are a means  of transport of money. Pay-in slips encourage the sorting of cash and coins, are filled in and signed by the person who deposited the money, and some tear off from a record that is also filled in by the depositor. Deposit slips are also called deposit tickets and come in a variety of designs. They are signed by the depositor if the depositor is cashing some of the accompanying check and depositing the rest.

Cash received 
On a deposit slip, "cash received" means that part of the amount on a cheque that is to be withdrawn as cash. The remainder is deposited into the person's account.

Completion of slips 
The description column on deposit slips has been used for over 100 years in the U.S. to notate where the bank should send the check to reclaim the money; this was done at first by notating in words the name of bank or its location. The bank's transit number, also called bank number, began to be used instead of words. The bank number was written as the upper line of a fraction, with the bottom number referring to the central bank branch. Some people wrote just the top of the fraction, others tried writing the entire fraction. After the introduction of automated sorting of checks, many people wrote nothing at all in the deposit slip's description column. Some people put the check writers' names in the description column. There was a tendency in the early teens of the 21st century to write in the number of the check being deposited without mentioning who the check was from.

See also
Passbook
Bank statement
Cheque book
Deposit account

References 

Banking terms
Paper products
Accounting source documents
Bank deposits